Sympergoides nasutus is a species of beetle in the family Cerambycidae, and the only species in the genus Sympergoides. It was described by Lane in 1970.

References

Apomecynini
Beetles described in 1970
Monotypic beetle genera